Bachelor Flat is a 1962 DeLuxe Color comedy film starring Terry-Thomas, Tuesday Weld, Richard Beymer, and Celeste Holm. Filmed in CinemaScope in Malibu, California, the film is a revised version of director Frank Tashlin's own Susan Slept Here of 1954.

Plot
A charming British anthropology Professor Bruce Patterson (Terry-Thomas) has to live with Helen Bushmill (Celeste Holm), his fiancée. Helen is away traveling, and has failed to tell him that she has a 17-year-old daughter Libby (Tuesday Weld), who shows up at her mother's home unaware that Helen is engaged. Meanwhile he has to resist the advances of the neighborhood ladies who barge in unexpectedly.

At the same time, Patterson must deal with the continual invasions of Mike (Richard Beymer), his cynical neighbor and law student, who soon develops a crush on Libby. Intertwined in the story is Mike's persistent dachshund, determined to bury the professor's prize possession of a rare dinosaur bone.

Cast
 Terry-Thomas as Bruce Patterson
 Tuesday Weld as Libby Bushmill
 Richard Beymer as Mike Polaski
 Celeste Holm as Helen Bushmill
 Francesca Bellini as Gladys
 Howard McNear as Dr. Bowman
 Ann Del Guercio as Liz
 Roxanne Arlen as Mrs. Roberts
 Alice Reinheart as Mrs. Bowman
 Stephen Bekassy as Paul
 Margo Moore as Moll

Production
In October 1960 20th Century Fox's Robert Goldstein announced he had bought the screen rights to a British stage comedy, Libby by Budd Grossman. The play had been staged in London the previous year. Grossman would write the script, Jack Cummings would direct and Frank Tashlin would direct. The plot was about an English professor at Hunter College who got involved with a group of 17 year olds on the loose from boarding school. It was to take place in Greenwich Village and was to be shot on location in New York in 1961.

Eventually the action was relocated to Malibu, where the film was shot starting April 1961. Lead roles were given to Fox contract stars Richard Beymer and Tuesday Weld. Gene Tierney was announced for the part of Weld's mother but Celeste Holm ended up playing it. After Ian Carmichael turned the film down Terry-Thomas was cast in the lead role; his first lead in an American film.

In an interview with Peter Bogdanovich, Tashlin said he included the dachshund as a satire on CinemaScope due to the dog's shape.

Critical reviews
Variety called it a "frivolous, farcical concoction" and credits much of the great comedy to the supporting cast. They praise Terry-Thomas's "comic intuition and creativity" saying it is also "responsible for most of the merriment". However, they say "neither Weld nor Beymer seems comfortably at home in farce, and the strain often shows through", and that Celeste Holm is "stuck regrettably in a rather bland role". The critic adds: "The dachshund, incidentally, is an accomplished low comedienne."

Eugene Archer in the New York Times did not favor the film, stating that Terry-Thomas "is at the mercy of the writer-director who usually turns out Jerry Lewis' broadest japes", referencing director Tashlin as the "responsible party", He also calls the plot "flimsy" and that Terry-Thomas "seems perplexed" in his performance. He concludes that "viewers with a tolerance for brash vulgarity and a fitful pace" will most likely show "astonishment, resignation, and, eventually, mild amusement."

See also
 List of American films of 1962

References

External links 
 
 Bachelor Flat at TCM
 
 

1962 films
1962 comedy films
20th Century Fox films
CinemaScope films
American comedy films
1960s English-language films
Films scored by John Williams
American films based on plays
1960s American films
English-language comedy films